The cuneiform Ne sign, is found in both the 14th century BC Amarna letters and the Epic of Gilgamesh. In the Amarna letters, it is especially used in the opening, and introductory paragraph of the clay tablet letter, when addressing the Pharaoh (King), or when sent to another individual who is part of the Pharaoh's correspondence, for the alternate syllabic usage of "bil", (used for the 'b'). In the Amarna letters, it is used as Bil (cuneiform), for the spelling of speaks, or "says", in the opening statement; the Akkadian language word is "qabû", for to say, tell. (There is a wide range of sign usage in the 300+ Amarna letters for spelling "qabû" in the introduction, or in the texts; some of the Amarna letters are texts other than actual 'letters'.)

The ne (cuneiform) sign has the following uses, besides "ne", in the Epic of Gilgamesh:

bil-(=bí (bi2))
kúm
ne
pil
ṭè
BIL (Sumerogram usage)
NE

The sign is a "two-part" compound sign. The center and left is the sign for am (cuneiform), and the right is the sign for is (cuneiform), (and listed as Giš (cuneiform), cuneiform "GIŠ" (the "is" sign) being the use for GIŠ (wood Sumerogram)).

The specific usage numbers for the sign's meaning in the Epic of Gilgamesh is as follows: bil-(9), kúm-(5), ne-(1), pil-(2), ṭè-(13), BIL-(3), NE-(1).

In the Amarna letters, the sign is used for spelling qabû in the introduction for letters: EA 9, EA 19, EA 141, EA 144, EA 205, EA 254, EA 270, EA 271, and EA 367, as well as some others.

Gallery

References

Moran, William L. 1987, 1992. The Amarna Letters. Johns Hopkins University Press, 1987, 1992. 393 pages.(softcover)
 Parpola, 1971. The Standard Babylonian Epic of Gilgamesh, Parpola, Simo, Neo-Assyrian Text Corpus Project, c 1997, Tablet I thru Tablet XII, Index of Names, Sign List, and Glossary-(pp. 119–145), 165 pages.
Ugarit Forschungen (Neukirchen-Vluyn). UF-11 (1979) honors Claude Schaeffer, with about 100 articles in 900 pages. pp 95, ff, "Comparative Graphemic Analysis of Old Babylonian and Western Akkadian", author Giorgio Buccellati, ( i.e. Ugarit and Amarna (letters), three others, Mari, OB,Royal, OB,non-Royal letters).

Cuneiform signs